The 2019 Provo Premier League is the 19th season of the Provo Premier League, the top division football competition in the Turks and Caicos Islands. The season began on 9 February 2019.

Teams
A total of six teams compete in the league. Academy Jaguars are the defending champions. Full Physic withdrew from the league, and were replace by Flamingo
Academy Eagles
Academy Jaguars (defending champions)
Beaches
Cheshire Hall
Flamingo (new entry)
SWA Sharks

Regular season

Playoffs

Finalists

References

External links
TCIFA

Provo Premier League
Turks and Caicos Islands
2019 in Turks and Caicos Islands football